Soltanabad (also Romanized as Solţānābād; also known as Soltan Abad Behandan and Solţānābād-e Behandān) is a village in Neh Rural District, in the Central District of Nehbandan County, South Khorasan Province, Iran. At the 2006 census, its population was 162, in 32 families.

References 

Populated places in Nehbandan County